The following pages deal with inequalities due to Mikhail Gromov:

 Bishop–Gromov inequality
 Gromov's inequality for complex projective space
 Gromov's systolic inequality for essential manifolds
 Lévy–Gromov inequality